Olufemi Temitope Ogunsanwo  (born 28 October 1977), known as Femi Oguns, is a prominent British agent and former actor who founded Identity School of Acting and Identity Agency Group.

Background 
Femi Oguns obtained a joint honours degree in Race and Culture and Performing Arts at university, after previously attending drama school. It was here he drew on personal experience and longed to create a drama school which would give actors of all ethnicities the platform to express themselves to their fullest, and so founded Identity School of Acting in October 2003.

Oguns' achievements have led to a series of high-profile commendations; in 2010 he was named as a UK Film Council Breakthrough Brit in the fields of Acting and Writing. In 2014, Oguns was appointed Member of the Order of the British Empire (MBE) for his services to the acting industry, and in 2017 he was the first agent in the UK to be awarded with a special jury prize by the British Independent Film Award (BIFA) for his contribution to the British film industry. He has also been named on Powerful Media's Powerlist of the top 100 most influential figures of African/Caribbean descent, having made the top 100 in both the 2020 and 2021 editions.

Early career 

As an actor, Oguns has featured in a number of award-winning dramas in both television and film. His credits include: Strange (BBC), Take my Heart Dogma (Channel 4), the BAFTA nominated Prime Suspect (ITV), feature film La Chinoise for FilmFour, feature film Last Chance Harvey opposite Dustin Hoffman, and Ron Howard's The Good Lie with Reese Witherspoon.

Oguns has also carved out a successful career in the field of writing, where his debut play Torn received the MSVA Award for Best Stage Production 2008. Torn included Wil Johnson, Kéllé Bryan, Antonia Okonma, Richard Hollis, Michelle Asante, and Brooke Kinsella. The success of Torn caught the attention of the Royal National Theatre, and The Royal Court where Oguns developed his second play, Sponge.

Identity School and Agency

Identity School of Acting was founded by Oguns and provides acting training, specializing in minority actors and has demonstrated some success. Founded in 2006, Identity Agency Group (IAG) is an acting agency.

In 2011 IAG US division was formed, merging with some of the top agencies and management companies in the United States, representing clients both in the UK and North America. IAG Los Angeles is now working in partnership with the likes of WME, UTA, Gersh, and ICM to name but a few.

Some of IAG's clients include:

John Boyega
Malachi Kirby (Bafta Breakthrough Brit) 
Letitia Wright (BAFTA Breakthrough Brit)
Melanie Liburd
Charlie Covell (BAFTA Breakthrough Brit)
Cecilia Noble(Laurence Olivier Award nominated)
Alexis Rodney

References

External links

Identity Drama School

English dramatists and playwrights
Living people
English people of Nigerian descent
English people of Yoruba descent
English theatre managers and producers
English male television actors
English male stage actors
English talent agents
Members of the Order of the British Empire
Yoruba dramatists and playwrights
English male dramatists and playwrights
1977 births